The fifth season of The Golden Girls premiered on NBC on September 23, 1989, and concluded on May 5, 1990. The season consisted of 26 episodes.

Broadcast history
The season originally aired Saturdays at 9:00-9:30 pm (EST) on NBC from September 23, 1989 to May 5, 1990.

Episodes

References

External links

Golden Girls (season 5)
1989 American television seasons
1990 American television seasons